Don Emilio Bonelli y Hernando (7 November 1854 in Zaragoza, Aragon – 28 November 1926 in Madrid) was a Spanish military officer, author, explorer, colonial administrator and Africanist.

Biography 
Bonelli entered the Spanish Army in 1875 and attended the Toledo Infantry Academy, achieving the rank of ensign in 1878. He left the Army in 1882, and undertook an expedition through the interior of Morocco, crossing the territory between Fez, Meknes and Tangier.

In 1884, Bonelli commanded an expedition to take the territory of Río de Oro (Oued Edhahab), occupying the Atlantic coast between Cape Bojador (Ras Bujadur) and Cape Blanco (Ras Nouadhibou) and founding Villa Cisneros (Dakhla). On 26 December 1884, the Kingdom of Spain declared 'a protectorate of the African coast', and on 14 January 1885 officially informed the other great powers in writing, thereby establishing Spanish Sahara. In July 1885, Bonelli was appointed by King Alfonso XII to the newly created position of Royal Commissioner on the West Coast of Africa (which would later be renamed as Political and Military Subgovernor of Río de Oro), managing to establish peace with tribes in the area.

Works 
Bonelli was the author of:
 El imperio de Marruecos y su constitución (1882)
 El Sahara (1887)
 Nuevos territorios españoles en África (1887)
 El problema de Marruecos (1910)

References

Bibliography 
 
 
 
 

1854 births
1926 deaths
People from Zaragoza
19th-century Spanish military personnel
Spanish colonial governors and administrators
History of Western Sahara
Spanish Africanists
20th-century Spanish military personnel